Sofiya Kabanova (born 29 May 1970) is a Uzbekistani athlete. She competed in the women's heptathlon at the 2000 Summer Olympics.

References

1970 births
Living people
Athletes (track and field) at the 2000 Summer Olympics
Uzbekistani heptathletes
Olympic athletes of Uzbekistan
Place of birth missing (living people)